Morococala is a volcanic field in Bolivia, in the Department Oruro. It is formed by ignimbrites and associated volcanic features.

It is part of the chain of plutons that extends over the Cordillera Real and the Cordillera Occidental and are the sites of mining activity.

Geography and geomorphology 

It lies in the Cordillera Occidental. The city of Oruro lies northwest of Morococala, and the town of Llallagua is just south. 

Morococala consists of a high plateau, and is a field consisting of ignimbrites and tuffs, which were deposited on top of the basement. The presence of two calderas has been inferred, one at Tankha Tankha in the northern part of the field and one at Condoriri in the southern part of the field. The Tankha Tankha caldera has a resurgent dome which has erupted domes and lava flows. Other volcanic landforms in the field are lava domes. Mines are located at San Pablo, Morococala and Japo.

Morococala is part of the so-called Bolivian Tin Belt, a string of plutons of Permian to Pliocene age extending from Peru over Bolivia to Argentina. These may or may not be associated with surface volcanic features but contain many mineral deposits. Some areas are associated with Late Miocene ignimbrites, such as Morococala and Los Frailes Plateau. A number of mineralization areas exist at Morococala in the sediment layers, many of them in the sediment layers and associated with volcanic structures.

Composition 

Tuffs are gray to white and typically rich in crystals in a mostly devitrified matrix.

The rocks of Morococala are dominantly dacite and rhyodacite. There is a north-south gradient with the larger northern part of the field being latitic and the smaller southern part rhyolitic. Phenocrysts include biotite, feldspar and quartz. In addition, the peraluminous minerals andalusite, cordierite and muscovite. Hydrothermal alteration has occurred on these rocks.

Basement 

Various Silurian and Devonian sedimentary formations exist in the area as well. A number of subvolcanic intrusions of Oligocene to Miocene age are also found there.

Eruptive history 

The oldest date obtained on intrusive rocks at San Pablo is 23.3 ± 0.4 million years ago. Hydrothermal alteration occurred later, 20.2 ± 0.35 million years ago. The ignimbrite was deposited much later, 6 million years ago.

Three different stages of ignimbritic volcanism have been delineated by argon-argon dating. The first and oldest occurred 8.4 million years ago and formed the rhyolitic tuffs. The second 6.8 million years ago also formed a rhyolitic tuff and originated from the Condoriri caldera. The third 6.4 million years ago originated from the Tankha Tankha caldera.

References

Sources 

 
 
 
 

Volcanic fields
Volcanoes of Bolivia
Miocene volcanoes